Marek Vydra (born 14 March 1975 in Prague) is a Czech male curler.

At the national level, he is a ten-time Czech male champion curler.

Teams

Personal life
He started curling in 1997 at the age of 22.

References

External links

Vydra, Marek - 1.CK Brno

Living people
1975 births
Sportspeople from Prague
Czech male curlers
Czech curling champions